Kerryn or Keryn is a given name, popular in Australia. Notable people with the name include:

Kerryn Manning (born 1976), Australian horse trainer/driver
Kerryn McCann (1967–2008), Australian athlete.
Kerryn Phelps (born 1957), Australian medical practitioner and public commentator.
Kerryn Rim (born 1962), Australian biathlete.
Kerryn Tolhurst (born 1948), Australian musician and songwriter.
Keryn Jordan (1975–2013), South African footballer.
Keryn Williams (born 1949), Australian medical scientist and ophthalmology researcher.